The Sparta is a 48-metre (157-foot) Russian-flagged fishing trawler and refrigerator ship.

Ross Sea accident
On 16 December 2011 the Sparta sent out a distress signal after it struck a submerged iceberg while fishing for Antarctic cod in the Ross Sea. The Royal New Zealand Air Force twice sent Hercules aircraft on seven-hour flights from Christchurch to air-drop equipment. (The planes had to refuel at McMurdo Station in Antarctica before returning to base.) The air-drops allowed the 32-man crew to pump out the flooded hold, make temporary repairs and stabilise the listing ship.

Pack ice meant nearby vessels, such as the Norwegian Seljevaer and Sparta's Russian sister ship Chiyo Maru 3, were unable to come to Sparta's aid. The crew of the Sparta, made up of 16 Indonesians, 15 Russians and a Ukrainian researcher, had to wait until 26 December 2011 when the South Korean icebreaker RV Araon arrived. One of the Araon's first tasks was to pump fuel into the raised side of the Sparta, thus lifting the damaged hull and exposing it to the air. Sparta was stuck for 12 days before repairs could be made and it could head for safety in Port Nelson, New Zealand.

With the ship's fate in the balance, biologist David Ainley had criticised the system of fishing permits that allowed "underpowered, single-hulled boats" to operate in the area and the costs involved in rescuing them. Ecologist Alexei Knishkikov added his concern for local marine wildlife, should any of the Sparta's 200 tons of light fuel oil leak into the sea. In the event, only a little hydraulic oil spilled into the water.

References

Fishing vessels
Fishing in Russia
Merchant ships of Russia